Marco Ferrari (born 21 August 1966 in Rimini) is a retired Italian professional footballer who played as a goalkeeper.

Honours
Parma
 UEFA Cup Winners' Cup winner: 1992–93.
 UEFA Super Cup winner: 1993.

External links
 Career summary by playerhistory.com

1966 births
Living people
Italian footballers
Association football goalkeepers
Serie A players
Serie B players
Serie C players
Parma Calcio 1913 players
Rimini F.C. 1912 players
U.S. Avellino 1912 players
People from Rimini